Severn Bridge railway station was a small station on the Severn Bridge Railway located close to the north west bank of the River Severn,  northeast of Lydney in Gloucestershire, England.

History

The Severn Bridge Railway linked Lydney Junction railway station on the north bank of the River Severn with Sharpness Docks on the south bank via the Severn Railway Bridge. The railway joined up at Sharpness with the Sharpness Branch Line which had been built from Berkeley Road railway station on the Bristol and Gloucester Railway to the docks in 1875. The opening of the bridge in 1879 provided a cross-Severn route for Forest of Dean and south Wales coal both to Sharpness docks and to Bristol.

On the north side of the river, the bridge was approached on a series of arches, one of which traversed the Gloucester to Chepstow and Newport main line. Severn Bridge station was on the embankment leading up these arches, on a section of the line that ran almost parallel with and to the north of the main line as both went into Lydney Junction, about two miles to the south west.

Severn Bridge station had a passing loop, small shelters on the two platforms and a signalbox. There was a short siding with a cattle pen at the end of the station nearer to the bridge, which closed in 1957. At times, the station was known as "Severn Bridge for Blakeney".

The Severn Railway Bridge was hit by petrol barges in a shipping accident on 25 October 1960 which demolished two of its 22 spans, and it was judged to be beyond economic repair. All services on the line were suspended, though it was not officially closed until November 1964. The Severn Bridge station site, according to a book published in 2003, was then "just left to rot".

Services

References

External links
Photographs of the disused location in the mid 1960s

Disused railway stations in Gloucestershire
Former Severn and Wye Railway stations
Railway stations in Great Britain opened in 1879
Railway stations in Great Britain closed in 1964
Beeching closures in England
Lydney